Italy competed at the 1934 European Athletics Championships in Turin, Italy, between 7 and 9 September 1934.

Medalists

Placing table

Top eight

Results

 Decathlon

See also
 Italy national athletics team

References

External links
 EAA official site

Italy at the European Athletics Championships
Nations at the 1934 European Athletics Championships
1934 in Italian sport